Alex Troffey (14 June 1895 – 11 September 1978) was a Polish-born film editor who immigrated to the United States in 1905.

Selected filmography
 The Border Legion (1918)
 Home Sweet Home (1926)
 Fleetwing (1928)
 Hot Pepper (1933)
 Black Sheep (1935)
 Star for a Night (1936)
 Think Fast, Mr. Moto (1937)
 The Man Who Wouldn't Talk (1940)
 They Meet Again (1941)
 Whispering Ghosts (1942)

References

Bibliography
 Hanke, Ken. Charlie Chan at the Movies: History, Filmography, and Criticism. McFarland, 1990.

External links

1895 births
1978 deaths
People from Ostrołęka
People from Łomża Governorate
Polish film editors
Congress Poland emigrants to the United States
American film editors